Jocelyne Gagné is the Associate Chief Justice of the Federal Court of Canada. Prior to her appointment she served as president of the Commercial Litigation Committee of the Canadian Bar Association.

References

Judges of the Federal Court of Canada
Canadian women judges
Living people
Year of birth missing (living people)